Dipotassium phosphate (K2HPO4) (also dipotassium hydrogen orthophosphate; potassium phosphate dibasic) is the inorganic compound with the formula K2HPO4.(H2O)x (x = 0, 3, 6).  Together with monopotassium phosphate (KH2PO4.(H2O)x), it is often used as a fertilizer, food additive, and buffering agent. It is a white or colorless solid that is soluble in water.

It is produced commercially by partial neutralization of phosphoric acid with two equivalents of potassium chloride:
 H3PO4 + 2 KCl → K2HPO4 + 2 HCl

Uses
As a food additive, dipotassium phosphate is used in imitation dairy creamers, dry powder beverages, mineral supplements, and starter cultures. It functions as an emulsifier, stabilizer and texturizer; it also is a buffering agent, and chelating agent especially for the calcium in milk products..

As a food additive, dipotassium phosphate is categorized by the United States Food and Drug Administration as generally recognized as safe (GRAS).

References

Potassium compounds
Phosphates
Acid salts
Food additives
E-number additives
Inorganic fertilizers